Werner Luis Schuler Gamarra (born 27 July 1990) is a Peruvian professional footballer who plays as a centre-back for Universidad Técnica de Cajamarca in the Torneo Descentralizado.

He was born in Asunción, Paraguay and also has Swiss nationality.

Club career
Schuler started his senior career in 2008 with América Cochahuayco, a farm team of Universitario de Deportes. There he played under the management of Tito Chumpitaz in the 2008 Segunda División Peruana.

Then in January 2009 he joined Sport Boys. The club was competing in the Segunda División Peruana at the time and finished as champions at the end of the 2009 season. With Sport Boys promoted the following year, Schuler made his Torneo Descentralizado debut on 8 May 2010 in Round 13 at home against Universidad San Martín. Manager Miguel Company placed him in the starting eleven alongside Alexander Callens in the centre of defence, but his debut ended in a 0–1 loss for his side.

Honours

Club
Universitario de Deportes
 Torneo Descentralizado (1): 2013
 U-20 Copa Libertadores (1): 2011

References

External links

1990 births
Living people
Sportspeople from Asunción
Paraguayan people of Swiss descent
Association football central defenders
Paraguayan footballers
Peruvian footballers
Peruvian Segunda División players
Peruvian people of Swiss descent
Peruvian Primera División players
U América F.C. footballers
Sport Boys footballers
Club Universitario de Deportes footballers
Club Deportivo Universidad de San Martín de Porres players
FBC Melgar footballers
Universidad Técnica de Cajamarca footballers